Cumières-le-Mort-Homme is a ghost commune in the Meuse department in Grand Est in north-eastern France.

Since the end of the Battle of Verdun in 1916, it has been unoccupied (official population: 0), as have Bezonvaux, Beaumont-en-Verdunois, Haumont-près-Samogneux, Louvemont-Côte-du-Poivre, and Fleury-devant-Douaumont.

History
During World War I, the town was destroyed and the land made so uninhabitable that officials decided not to rebuild it. The site is maintained as a testimony to war and is officially designated a "village that died for France." It is managed by a municipal council of three members appointed by the prefect of the Meuse department.

See also
 Zone rouge (First World War)
 List of French villages destroyed in World War I
 Communes of the Meuse department

References

Cumiereslemorthomme
Destroyed towns
Former populated places in France